Tempsat-1 was a United States Navy Radar calibration object, launched from Vandenberg Air Force Base on a Thor Ablestar on August 13, 1965. It was mainly used in investigation of spacecraft technology and orbits.

References

Spacecraft launched in 1965
Satellites of the United States